Palazzo Gualterio is a palace opposite the Torre del Moro Orvieto in Orvieto in the Province of Terni, Italy. It was built by the ancient Gualterio family, and decorated with stucco and frescoes. Filippo Antonio Gualterio was the last of the family to live there. The palace was then given to the Banco di Roma, while objects of art were transferred to the museum and halls of the Town Hall of Orvieto, where there are still preserved.

References

Palaces in Umbria
Buildings and structures in Orvieto